The following list articles cover the current U.S. state legislators:

 List of U.S. state senators
 List of U.S. state representatives (Alabama to Missouri)
 List of U.S. state representatives (Montana to Wyoming)